Sally Azar is a Palestinian pastor. She was ordained on January 22, 2023 by the Evangelical Lutheran Church in Jordan and the Holy Land in a ceremony at the Church of the Redeemer in Jerusalem, making her the first female Palestinian pastor in the Holy Land. Azar is the daughter of bishop Sani Ibrahim Azar.

References 

Palestinian Christians
Palestinian Lutheran clergy
Year of birth missing (living people)
Living people
University of Göttingen alumni